Austria was the host of the 2012 Winter Youth Olympics in Innsbruck, Austria. With 81 athletes competing, Austria was the largest team at these Games. The host nation competed in all events except for the Figure Skating pair's event.

Medalists

Medals awarded to participants of mixed-NOC (combined) teams are represented in italics. These medals are not counted towards the individual NOC medal tally.

Alpine skiing

Boys

Girls

Team

Biathlon

Boys

Girls

Mixed

Bobsleigh

Boys
Benjamin Maier and Robert Ofensberger will compete for Austria in the boys' bobsleigh event>

Cross-country skiing

Boys

Girls

Sprint

Mixed

Curling

Mixed team
Team
Skip: Mathias Genner
Third: Camilla Schnabl
Second: Martin Reichel
Lead: Irena Brettbacher

Standings

Round-robin results

Draw 1

Draw 2

Draw 3

Draw 4

Draw 5

Draw 6

Draw 7

Mixed doubles

Results

Round of 32

Round of 16

Quarterfinals

Figure skating

Boys

Girls

Ice Dance

Freestyle skiing

Ski Cross

Boy

Girl

Ski Halfpipe

Ice hockey

Girls' tournament

Roster 
Source: International Ice Hockey Federation

Coaching staff
Head coach: Christian Yngve

Assistant coach: Klaus Kuhs

Results

Preliminary round 

Group A

Semifinals

Gold medal game

Final rank:

Boys' tournament

Roster 
Austria will compete in the boys' ice hockey tournament with a roster of 17 players:

Coaching staff
Head Coach: Kurt Harand
Assistant Coach: Harald Pschernig
Assistant Coach: Wolfgang Hagen
Equipment Manager: Wolfgang Nickel
Team Leader: Wolfgang Ebner

Results

Preliminary rRound 

Group A

Austria  fails to advance to the semifinals.

Skills challenge

Boys

Girls

Luge

Singles

Doubles

Team

Nordic combined

Short Track

Boys

Girls

Mixed

Skeleton

Ski jumping

Team w/Nordic Combined

Snowboarding

Speed skating

Boys

See also
Austria at the 2012 Summer Olympics

References

External links
Olympia.at Official homepage of the Austrian Olympic Committee

2012 in Austrian sport
Nations at the 2012 Winter Youth Olympics
Austria at the Youth Olympics